Walter Houston Hall (born June 12, 1947) is an American professional golfer.

Early life 
Hall was born in Winston-Salem, North Carolina. He played collegiately at the University of Maryland, College Park.

Career 
Hall turned professional but regained his amateur status in the 1970s. He turned professional again in 1994 and played on the Asian Tour in 1994 and 1995 and the NGA Hooters Tour in 1996.

Hall joined the Senior PGA Tour in 1997 and has won once, the 2001 AT&T Canada Senior Open Championship. He also won the PGA Seniors Championship on the European Seniors Tour in 1997.

Professional wins (2)

Senior PGA Tour wins (1)

Senior PGA Tour playoff record (1–1)

European Senior Tour wins (1)

External links

American male golfers
Maryland Terrapins men's golfers
PGA Tour Champions golfers
European Senior Tour golfers
Golfers from North Carolina
Sportspeople from Winston-Salem, North Carolina
1947 births
Living people